Rugotyphis francescae is an extinct species of sea snail, a marine gastropod mollusk, in the family Muricidae, the murex snails or rock snails.

Distribution
This species occurs in New Zealand.

References

 Maxwell, P. A. (2009). Cenozoic Mollusca. Pp 232-254 in Gordon, D. P. (ed.) New Zealand inventory of biodiversity. Volume one. Kingdom Animalia: Radiata, Lophotrochozoa, Deuterostomia. Canterbury University Press, Christchurch.

External links
 Finlay H.J. (1924). New shells from New Zealand Tertiary beds. Transactions of the New Zealand Institute. 55: 450-479, pls. 48-51

francescae
Gastropods described in 1924